Simeon Laiseri was a Tanzanian chief of the Arusha people. He was born in 1888 in Arusha, Arusha Region, Tanzania. He died in 1983 at the age of 95. He was inaugurated on January 14, 1948, as the first leader of the United Waarusha Community by the British administration's indirect rule policy. He fought against colonialism, and is one of the founding fathers of the City of Arusha.

References

1888 births
1983 deaths
Tanzanian chiefs
People from Arusha District
People from Arusha Region
People of Tanganyika